The following units and commanders of the Union Army fought at the Mobile campaign of the American Civil War involving the battles of Spanish Fort and Fort Blakeley. The units engaged against Spanish Fort involved Veatch's Division, Benton's Division and Henry Bertram's Brigade from the XIII Corps along with McArthur's Division and Carr's Division from the XVI Corps.  The units engaged against Fort Blakeley involved Veatch's Division and Andrews' Division (minus Bertram's brigade) from the XIII Corps, Garrard's Division from the XVI Corps and Steele's Pensacola Column.  The Confederate order of battle is shown separately.

This order of battle covers the period of March–April 1865.  For the Union and Confederate forces at the Battle of Mobile Bay from August 2–23, 1864, see: Mobile Bay order of battle.

Abbreviations used

Military rank
 MG = Major general
 BG = Brigadier general
 Col = Colonel
 Ltc = Lieutenant colonel
 Maj = Major
 Cpt = Captain
 Lt = 1st lieutenant

Other
 w = wounded

Army of West Mississippi

MG Edward R. S. Canby, 45,200

General Staff
 Chief-of-Staff: MG Peter J. Osterhaus
 Provost Marshal: BG George L. Andrews
 Aide-de-Camp: Brevet BG Cyrus B. Comstock
 Chief Engineer: Brevet Col Miles D. McAlester
 Asst. Adjutant General: Ltc Christian T. Christensen
 Asst. Inspector General: Ltc John M. Wilson
 Quartermaster: Ltc Charles G. Sawtelle
 Commissary of Subsistence: Ltc Chester Bingham Hinsdill

XIII Corps

MG Gordon Granger, 13,200, excluding 2nd and 3rd Brigades, 2nd Division

XVI Corps

MG Andrew Jackson Smith, 16,000

Column from Pensacola
MG Frederick Steele, 13,200

Cavalry
Bvt MG Benjamin Grierson

Notes

Sources
 War of the Rebellion: The Official Records of the Union and Confederate Armies, Series I, Volume 49, part 1, page 105
  Unit strengths

American Civil War orders of battle